Dibrugarh Polytechnic is a premier technical Institute of upper Assam which was established in 1965. It is affiliated to State Council for Technical Education, Assam under the Directorate of Technical Education, Government of Assam and is recognised by the All India Council for Technical Education.

Location
The institute is situated at the Lahowal, 1.8 km from National Highway 37. It is surrounded by lash green tea gardens providing excellent environment for study. Dibrugarh railway station is 5 km and Dibrugarh Airport is 6 km away from it. The institute is well-connected by roads to Dibrugarh.

Academics
The Institution offers 3 year diploma courses in Civil Engineering,
Electrical Engineering and
Mechanical Engineering. All courses are affiliated to State Council of Technical Education, Assam under Director of Technical Education, Assam. Admission in these courses is based on the Polytechnic Admission Test conducted by Director of Technical Education, Assam.

Departments
 Department of Civil Engineering
 Department of Electrical Engineering
 Department of Mechanical Engineering
 Department of Physics
 Department of Chemistry
 Department of Mathematics
 Department of Humanities
 Workshop Departments

References 

Engineering colleges in Assam
Dibrugarh district
Educational institutions established in 1965
1965 establishments in Assam